Dominique Damar Thompson (born December 28, 1982) is a former American football wide receiver. He was signed by the St. Louis Rams as an undrafted free agent in 2005. He played college football at William & Mary.

Thompson was also a member of the Carolina Panthers and Florida Tuskers.

Professional career

Florida Tuskers
On August 17, 2009, Thompson was signed by the Florida Tuskers of the United Football League.

References

1982 births
Living people
Players of American football from Louisiana
American football wide receivers
William & Mary Tribe football players
St. Louis Rams players
Carolina Panthers players
Florida Tuskers players
Philadelphia Soul players